Ariyon Bakare is an English actor. He has appeared in the BBC One soap opera Doctors as Ben Kwarme, the Amazon Prime television series Good Omens and Carnival Row, and the BBC One and HBO series His Dark Materials. Prior to this, Bakare made appearances on British dramas such as The Bill, Casualty, and Holby City.

Early life

Due to conflict with his father, Bakare left his family home at the age of 15, and completed his education while homeless. Years later, he returned home and "made peace" with his father. Then at the age of 17, Bakare moved from London to New York to pursue dance as a career, and trained as dancer  at  various conservatories  including  Alvin Ailey American Dance Theater. Two years into his training, he was informed that dancers often retire at a young age. The next day, he gave dance up, and began focusing on acting. He moved back to London at the age of 20, and began studying acting at Drama Centre London. He stated that while performing with the RSC, he also worked on jobs in Scotland, as well as learning scriptwriting and singing soul and opera music.

Career
From 2001 to 2005, Bakare portrayed the role of Ben Kwarme in the BBC soap opera Doctors. For his portrayal of the role, he was nominated for Best Actor at the 2004 British Soap Awards. After leaving Doctors, Bakare returned to direct and write several episodes. He then co-wrote and starred in the Channel drama Stealing Lives. In November 2008, he appeared as a villain in the BBC drama Spooks, and in October 2009, he made an appearance in Casualty. In 2011, Bakare played a mini-cab driver, Carl Lucas, in the last episode of the sixth series of Law & Order UK, first broadcast in 2012. He appeared in Dancing on the Edge, first broadcast in 2013, as Wesley Holt, a band manager. Bakare later appeared in Doctor Who, in the 2015 episode, "The Woman Who Lived", alongside Maisie Williams. He played the antagonist of the episode, a lion-like creature called Leandro. He had a cameo as a Rebel pilot in Rogue One: A Star Wars Story. In 2019, he began appearing in the BBC TV series His Dark Materials, in the role of Lord Boreal.

Bakare's theatre credits include productions at the RSC and the Lyric Hammersmith. He was nominated for an Ian Charleson Award for the role of Florindo in Tim Supple's staging of A Servant to Two Masters at the Young Vic theatre. He starred opposite Janet Suzman in the British premiere of Dream of the Dog, where he played a South African nattily clad architect, "Look Smart".

Filmography

References

External links 
 

English people of Nigerian descent
English people of Yoruba descent
English male stage actors
English male radio actors
English male voice actors
English male film actors
English television writers
English television directors
English male soap opera actors
21st-century English male actors
Black British male actors
English male Shakespearean actors
Royal Shakespeare Company members
Male actors from London
Yoruba male actors
Living people
British male television writers
Year of birth missing (living people)